Luna E-1 No.3, sometimes identified by NASA as Luna 1958C, was a Soviet spacecraft which was lost in a launch failure in 1958. It was a  Luna E-1 spacecraft, the third of four to be launched, all of which were involved in launch failures. It was intended to impact the surface of the Moon, and in doing so become the first man-made object to reach its surface.

The spacecraft was intended to release  of sodium, in order to create a cloud of the metal which could be observed from Earth, allowing the spacecraft to be tracked. Prior to the release of information about its mission, NASA correctly identified that it had been an attempted Lunar impact mission.

Luna E-1 No.3 was launched on 4 December 1958 atop a Luna 8K72 carrier rocket, flying from Site 1/5 at the Baikonur Cosmodrome. Two hundred and forty five seconds into the flight, a hydrogen peroxide pump seized up due to loss of lubrication, which caused the rocket's core stage engines to fail.

References

Luna programme
Spacecraft launched in 1958